Hypselocara is a monotypic genus of South American dwarf spiders containing the single species, Hypselocara altissimum. It was first described by Alfred Frank Millidge in 1991, and has only been found in Venezuela.

See also
 List of Linyphiidae species (A–H)

References

Linyphiidae
Monotypic Araneomorphae genera
Spiders of South America